The Royal Norwegian Ministry of Fisheries and Coastal Affairs was a Norwegian ministry responsible for fisheries industry, aquaculture industry, seafood safety, fish health and welfare, harbours, water transport infrastructure and emergency preparedness for pollution incidents.

It was created in 1946, as the Ministry of Fisheries. In 2004 it received responsibility for coastal affairs, and changed its name. The department must report to the legislature, Storting.

It is since October 2013 led by Elisabeth Aspaker (Conservative), a member of Solberg's Cabinet. 
On 1 January 2014 it was incorporated into the new Ministry of Trade, Industry and Fisheries.

Organisation
The ministry was divided into the following sections:
Political staff
Communication unit
Department of Aquaculture, Seafood and Markets
Department of Coastal Affairs
Department of Research and Innovation
Department of Marine Resources and Environment

Subsidiaries
Subordinate government agencies were:
 Institute of Marine Research
 Norwegian Coastal Administration
 National Institute of Nutrition and Seafood Research
 Norwegian Directorate of Fisheries

Wholly owned limited companies were:
 Norwegian Seafood Export Council

Partially owned limited companies were:
 Nofima, The Norwegian Institute of Food, Fisheries and Aquaculture Research

References

Fisheries and Coastal Affairs
Water transport in Norway
Norway
Ministries established in 1946
Ministry of Fisheries
Ministries disestablished in 2014
2014 disestablishments in Norway
Maritime affairs ministries
Ministry of Fisheries
Transport organisations based in Norway